Red Zone is a 1994 scrolling shooter game developed by Zyrinx and published by Time Warner Interactive for the Sega Genesis.

The game is notable for its use of several technologies that were not prevalent at the time on the Genesis/Mega Drive, such as full screen rotation, 3D vectors, real-time zoom and full-motion video.

The developer deemed a pre-release version of this game — Hardwired — publicly distributable.

Reception
Electronic Gaming Monthly rated the game 6.8 out of 10, praising its combat and aerial sequences as "innovative" while noting its difficulty and learning curve. They also mentioned the amount of weapons and missions available to the player. 

GamePro praised the helicopter handling and graphical intro, but concluded that the poor controls when maneuvering characters on the ground effectively killed any potential enjoyment.

Next Generation rated the game 3 out of 5 stars, stating that "While Red Zone'''s plot and gameplay are surely blatant rip-offs from Urban Strike, the enormous challenges fundamentally make this title a viable alternative to the ongoing success of the Strike'' series."

References

External links
 

1994 video games
Helicopter video games
Scrolling shooters
Sega Genesis games
Sega Genesis-only games
Time Warner Interactive games
Top-down video games
Video games about nuclear war and weapons
Video games about terrorism
Video games scored by Jesper Kyd
Video games developed in Denmark